The following army units were involved in the Battle of Moorefield on August 7, 1864, near  
Moorefield, West Virginia, in the American Civil War. The Union Army units, and their commanders, are listed first. The Confederate Army units, and their commanders, follow. Three of the Union regiments were organized in West Virginia, and all of the Confederate regiments were organized in either Virginia, or Maryland. Most of the fighting took place within Hardy County. A small Union division commanded by Brigadier General William W. Averell surprised a larger Confederate force commanded by Brigadier General John McCausland and captured over 400 men. McCausland's force had burned the city of Chambersburg, Pennsylvania, on July 30.

Abbreviations used

Military rank
 BG = Brigadier General
 Col = Colonel
 Ltc = Lieutenant Colonel
 Maj = Major
 Capt = Captain
 Lt = 1st Lieutenant

Other
 w  = wounded
 k  = killed
 det = Detachment
 MOH      = Medal of Honor

Union Army Department of West Virginia

2nd Cavalry Division, Cavalry Corps, Army of West Virginia
BG William W. Averell

 Averell had approximately 1,760 men.

Confederate Army Army of the Valley

Independent Command, Cavalry Division, Army of the Valley
BG John McCausland
Capt Achilles Tynes, staff

 McNeill's Rangers, commanded by Captain John Hanson McNeill, were nearby—but chose to camp further away because McNeill did not believe the Confederate camp sites were safely situated.
 Approximately 3,000 men were in McCausland's command.

Notes

Citations

References

 

American Civil War orders of battle